Morris Henry Sugarman (December 15, 1889 – October 12, 1946), was an Russian Empire-born American architect. He was of the architecture firm, Sugarman & Berger.

Biography
Morris Henry Sugarman was born on December 15, 1889 in Odessa, Odessky Uyezd, Kherson Governorate, Russian Empire (now Ukraine). He was the son of Marianne and Samuel Sugarman. He studied at the National Academy of Design at Columbia University, and in England and in France. 

In 1925, he was awarded the gold medal from the American Institute of Architects (AIA). He organized the architectural firm Sugarman & Berger in 1926. Together they designed the New Yorker Hotel, the Roerich Museum in New York City, the Fifth Avenue Hotel in New York City, the Mayfair Hotel in Philadelphia, Navarre Building in New York City, the Long Beach Hospital on Long Island, as well as buildings in Europe and Central America.

Sugarman died on October 12, 1946 after an illness at Doctors Hospital in Manhattan. His daughter was the fashion designer Joan "Tiger" Morse (who married, and was divorced from real estate developer William A. Moses).

References

20th-century American architects
1880s births
1946 deaths
Emigrants from the Russian Empire to the United States
National Academy of Design alumni
Columbia University alumni
Recipients of the AIA Gold Medal
Architects from New York City